To Take a Wife (VeLakahta Lekha Isha) is a 2004 drama film. It is the directorial debut of veteran actress Ronit Elkabetz, who also stars in the film. The French-Israeli production premiered at the 61st Venice International Film Festival in September 2004.

The film is the first in a trilogy about the unhappy marriage of Viviane. It was followed by Shiva in 2008, and Gett: The Trial of Viviane Amsalem in 2014.

Plot
In Haifa in 1979, hairdresser Viviane Amsalem listens to her brothers as they argue her out of asking her husband for a divorce and convince her to go back to him. In front of her family, her husband, Eliahou, promises her that everything will be different. However, in the morning, he leaves her to fend for herself as she struggles with attending to her four children. Before she starts work, she receives a call from Albert, a former lover, asking her to meet with him. Over the course of the day, she attends to her hairdressing clients, her husband, and her children, but as her petty grievances with her husband add up, she ends the night exploding at him and beating him with her fists in front of her children and her neighbour, who enters the home and helps to separate her from her husband.

The following day, Viviane agrees to see Albert in a cafe where he asks her to leave her husband and reveals that the last time he asked her, she was ready to go, but he ended up fleeing with his family to Africa. After their meeting, he drops her at a bus stop in the rain, but returns to give her a kiss.

The following morning, Viviane dreams that she is driving a car in the countryside. She is awakened by her husband who is angry because their eldest son refuses to go to synagogue with him. When Viviane asks him to leave their son alone, they fight, and the fight escalates to the point where Viviane, in anger, breaks the rules of Shabbat by lighting a match for her cigarette. Eliahou ultimately leaves for synagogue alone, leaving Viviane weeping. In synagogue, while serving as hazzan, he stumbles in his singing as he is still upset from his fight with his wife.

Cast
 Ronit Elkabetz as Viviane
 Simon Abkarian as Eliahou
 Gilbert Melki as Albert
 Sulika Kadosh as Mémé
 Dalia Beger as Dona
 Kobi Regev as Eviatar
 Omer Moshkovitz as Gabrielle
 Yam Eitan as Lior
 Valérie Zarrouk as Yvette
 Carl Zrihen as Victor

Production
The film was loosely based on the marriage of co-directors Ronit and Shlomi Elkabetz's parents. Like the characters in the movie, their mother was a hairdresser and their father a religious postal worker. The film was always planned to be the first in a series based on Viviane Amsalem's struggle to free herself.

Reception
The film received generally positive reviews. Critic Jay Weissberg writing for Variety likened the script to the writing of playwright Edward Albee and praised co-director and star Ronit Elkabetz in particular for a "searing portrayal [that] takes the breathe [sic] away."

Awards and nominations
Israeli Film Academy
 Ophir Award for Best Actress - Ronit Elkabetz (won)

Hamburg Film Festival
 Critics Award - Ronit Elkabetz & Shlomi Elkabetz (won)

Mons International Festival of Love Films
 Best Actor - Simon Abkarian (won)
 Best Actress - Ronit Elkabetz (won)

Thessaloniki Film Festival
 Best Actor - Simon Abkarian (won)
 Golden Alexandar Award - Ronit Elkabetz & Shlomi Elkabetz (nominated)

Venice Film Festival
 Audience Award (Critics' Week) - Ronit Elkabetz & Shlomi Elkabetz (won)
 Isvema Award - Ronit Elkabetz & Shlomi Elkabetz (won)

References

External links
 

2004 films
Israeli drama films
French drama films
Films directed by Ronit Elkabetz
Films shot in Israel
2000s French-language films
2000s Hebrew-language films
2000s Arabic-language films
2004 drama films
Films set in Haifa
Films about Moroccan Jews
2004 multilingual films
Israeli multilingual films
French multilingual films
2000s French films